The national flag of Antigua and Barbuda was adopted on 27 February 1967 to mark the achievement of self-government. A competition to design the flag was held in which more than 600 local people entered. The winning design was put forth by nationally well-known artist and sculptor Sir Reginald Samuel.

The design is a red field with an inverted isosceles triangle based on the top edge of the field pointed toward the bottom edge of the field bearing the horizontal tricolour of black, light blue (half width) and white with the rising sun centred on top of the black band. The rising sun symbolises the dawning of a new era.

The colours have different meanings: the black is for the African ancestry of the people; the blue for hope; and the red for energy or life of the people. The successive colouring of black, yellow, blue, and white (from the sun down) also stands for the soil, sun, sea, and sand. The blue also represents the Caribbean Sea, and the V-shape is the symbol of victory. The seven points on the flag represent each of the six parishes, and, the island of Barbuda.

The state ensign, which is used only by the national coast guard, consists of a white field, a red cross, and the state flag in the canton.

Viceregal flags

Flags of Barbuda

Historical flags

Political flags

Colors

References

External links

Flags introduced in 1967
Flag
National flags
Flags adopted through competition